Vaayai Moodi Pesavum is a 2014 Indian Tamil-language satirical romantic comedy film directed by Balaji Mohan. Produced by Varun Manian and S. Sashikanth under their respective production houses, Radiance Media Group and YNOT Studios, the film stars Dulquer Salmaan, in his maiden Tamil film, with Nazriya Nazim as female lead role while Madhoo, appearing in prominent role. It was filmed simultaneously in Tamil and Malayalam, the latter being titled as Samsaaram Aarogyathinu Haanikaram with a slightly changed supporting cast.

Principal photography commenced in November 2013 at Munnar and Kodaikanal. The film's technical crew includes newcomer Sean Roldan as the music director, Soundararajan as the cinematographer and Abhinav Sunder Nayak as the editor respectively. Both the versions were released on 25 April 2014, receiving positive reviews from critics.

Plot 
The following plot focuses on the Tamil version only.

The story takes place in Panimalai, a hill city, during the spring season. The film begins with RJ Balaji coming to Panimalai to be a guest of a live radio show. In the middle of the show, he starts coughing severely and suddenly loses his voice. He is diagnosed with a new type of virus called the mute flu that causes sudden muteness and sometimes even death.

Aravind is a sales representative working with a glue company. His dream is to become a radio jockey, and he even attends interviews with an FM station. As the mute flu spreads across the city, the state government sends Health Minister Sundaralingam to Panimalai to take care of the situation. The people are asked to undergo a medical checkup to check whether they are affected by the virus or not. Aravind goes to the hospital and meets Anjana, a junior doctor and attends the check up. While Anjana is testing Aravind, some young boys waiting for the test tease Anjana and in frustration, Anjana pokes a cotton bud into Aravinds' nose with which he starts choking and feels like vomiting, but is comforted by Anjana and they both start talking and here we are known more about Anjana, who believes that talking is the only cause of all the problems in the world and if people keep things to themselves, then things will be very fine. Anjana is in a relationship with Vinodh, a possessive guy who always commands her on what she should do and what she should wear. Anjana lives with her father and stepmother Vidhya. Since Anjana lost her mother at a young age, she is reluctant to accept Vidhya as her mother, though she is a sweet and caring woman and always maintains a distance from her. Vidhya is an aspiring writer who is trying to get her husband's attention and support to write her third book. Her husband finds no time to talk to her as he is too busy with his work.

Panimalai comes into the news for another issue, where "Nuclear Star" Bhoomesh, a film superstar who has gone to shoot one of his films, is being opposed by Mattai Ravi, a drunkard who is President of the Drinkers Association, over the issue of Bhoomesh showing drunkards in a bad light in his films. The Drinkers Association and Bhoomesh's fans, led by Ganesh, form groups to fight over this issue.

Aravind and Anjana begin a friendship, and he insists to her that if everything is spoken directly from the heart, then there would be no problem between anyone. He asks her to speak openly with Vinodh and sort out the difference of opinion between them. She does not agree to this, and Aravind challenges her that if he successfully stops the feud between Bhoomesh and Ravi just by means of speaking, Anjana should talk openly with Vinodh to sort out their issues. However Aravind hates Bhoomesh to core, even the photo of him makes Aravind feel nauseous & disgusting. They both agree on the challenge and mark a deadline day. Aravind tries so many ways to stop the feud between Bhoomesh's fans and the Drinkers Association, but it ends up in an even bitter fight.  As time goes by, Aravind falls in love with Anjana, not knowing that she is engaged to Vinodh.

Aravind is brought up in an orphanage that belongs to Adhikesavan, a stubborn old man who is constantly asking the orphanage to be vacated so that he can rent it to richer tenants. Though Aravind helps the children in the orphanage by donating some of his money, it is not enough to save the orphanage. Aravind tries to speak to Adhikesavan and sort the issue, but the latter is too hesitant to speak with him. Aravind and his friend Sathish kidnap Adhikesavan and leave him in his son's house, making a close relationship.

The final report by the health organisation says that the dumb flu spreads only by means of speaking, and issues a speaking ban in the town. Everyone in the town tries to adjust to living with not speaking. Aravind conducts the meeting with the Drinkers Association and Bhoomesh's fans, and they reconcile. A cure for the illness is invented, but if the virus has already infected but has not removed the voice of a person, the cure has a 50% probability of a side effect that the patient might lose the ability to speak. The film ends with everyone getting cured, but Sundaralingam, who has been faking the illness being given cure medicine on the stage for a photo op, loses his voice for real.

Cast 

Tamil version
 Mime Gopi as Politician
 RJ Balaji as himself, who is the first person to contract the mute flu
 Balaji Mohan as TV News Reporter for News Prime

Malayalam version
 Vijayan as Thomas Kuzhuvelikunnel
 Vineeth Sreenivasan (voice role)

Production 
In June 2013, the Radiance Group, led by Varun Manian entered a five-film deal with S. Sashikanth's YNOT Studios and venture into film production with a new entertainment company called Radiance Media. Varun stated that the company will be producing their first film with director Balaji Mohan for a bilingual film and plan to launch Dulquer Salman as the male lead, thus making his feature film debut in Tamil. Nazriya Nazim was signed as the heroine. About her role Nazriya said, "Anjana, my character, is somebody I haven't played in my career yet". Anirudh Ravichander, who was reported to be the film's music director, later opted out, and independent musician Ragahvendra, known under his stage name Sean Roldan, replaced him as music composer, thus making his debut. Soundararajan was signed up as the cinematographer. Abhinav Sunder Nayak was signed in as the Editor.

The film started filming in Munnar on 4 November 2013, with Madhoo joining the cast of the film, making her comeback in the Tamil and Malayalam film industries. Dulquer Salmaan dubbed himself in Tamil for this film.

Themes and influences 
Balaji Mohan described Vaayai Moodi Pesavum as a "sort of social and political satire. It presents a critique of our country’s political and social setup." He described the fictional flu, which renders people incapable of speaking, as a "metaphor for society’s refusal to communicate freely, which, I believe, is the root cause of all problems — personal, social and political."

Soundtrack 

The soundtrack and score for the film was composed by newcomer Sean Roldan. The album features eight tracks with lyrics written by Balaji Mohan, Muthamil and Madhan Karky, whereas lyrics for the Malayalam dubbed version Samsaaram Aarogyathinu Haanikaram, were written by Anu Elizabeth Jose and Santhosh Varma. Both the soundtracks use the same set of singers. The album of the Tamil version was released on 4 April 2014, at the film's audio launch event held at Sathyam Cinemas in Chennai, with Mani Ratnam being the chief guest along with the film's cast and crew. The soundtrack for the Malayalam version was released on 18 April 2014.

The soundtrack album received positive reviews from critics. Behindwoods gave the album 3 out of 5 stating it as "A highly original and competent debut from Sean Roldan." Milliblog summarises it as "Sean Roldan's musical debut is as eclectic and interesting as the man’s diverse musical sensibilities!" Sify gave 3.25 out of 5 stars to the album stating "Sean Roldan strikes the right chord with a very youthful, jolly and breezy album. We are sure the songs are going to add value to the entertainment sector of the movie."

Release 
The title poster of the film, with its logo was released on 23 January 2014, followed by the first look which was released on 25 January 2014. The official teaser of the film was released on 27 February 2014. The theatrical trailer was launched on 4 April 2014 at the film's audio launch.

Vaayai Moodi Pesavum along with its Malayalam version, Samsaaram Aarogyathinu Haanikaram was released worldwide on 25 April 2014. Its release was expected to be clashed with Jigarthanda (2014), which was postponed to July. Udhayanidhi Stalin's Red Giant Movies, acquired the theatrical rights. The film was cleared by the Central Board of Film Certification on 21 April 2014.

As a part of the film's marketing strategy, the multiplex partner SPI Cinemas showcased exclusive game kiosks for audiences on 23 April 2014, where people will participate in the game and win exclusive tickets for the film on 25 April. The kiosks were showcased in their multiplex chains Escape Cinemas, Luxe and Sathyam Cinemas.

Reception

Critical reception 
Tamil version
Sify wrote, "Vaayai Moodi Pesavum is refreshingly fresh, quirky and innovative. It is one of the best romcoms laced with satire in recent times, and a lead pair that crackles", going on to add, "Balaji Mohan has reinvented the romcom formula". The New Indian Express wrote, "The film may fall short in its entertainment quotient as compared to the director’s earlier film. But Mohan should be appreciated for his wacky, daring and innovative attempt". The Hindu wrote, "The film is filled with gags, satire and a cheeky commentary on life. While the laughter is loud and frequent in the theatre, half an hour later you wonder what the reason was for all the fuss. The film doesn't have a taut storyline that lingers in your mind. If that had been nailed, this would have been an experiment that really worked". The Times of India gave the film 4/5 and wrote, "Vaayai Moodi Pesavum is truly an ambitious effort, at least by Indian cinema standards, and what's truly heartening is that Balaji Mohan succeeds in his attempt. Deccan Chronicle gave it 3.5/5 and wrote, "there are many subtexts to the film – a little too many to delve into. However, like fine wine and certain genres of music, it does take a little getting used to. Vaayai Moodi Pesavum is definitely a bold attempt". IANS also gave 3.5/5 and called it "an almost brilliant film that contradicts itself at several junctures for reasons that are never explained and left to be figured out by the viewer". 3.5/5 was the rating given Rediff that wrote, "A totally new concept coupled with the director’s unique narrative style and a screenplay loaded with satire and comedy, makes Vaayai Moodi Pesavum, a thought-provoking and thoroughly enjoyable film". Behindwoods gave 3.25/5 and wrote, "Apart from the whacky concept, its seemingly quotable animated characters, the locations, colour, styling, music by Sean Roldan and the cinematography of Soundarrajan quite simply make Vaayai Moodi Pesavum the coolest film this summer". S Rajasekar of Cinemalead gave 3.25/5 and called the film "Classy, pleasant and feel good.". OneIndia gave 3/5 and concluded that the film is "A light-hearted family entertainer even though there are double entendre jokes at parts.". Indiaglitz gave 3/5 for the film and concluded that the film is "Pleasant and makes you feel good, so talk it out!". Bharath Vijaykumar of Moviecrow gave 3.25/5 and concluded, "VMP is a refreshingly original attempt at clean humour. This crazy attempt from Balaji Mohan definitely warrants the support of fans who want different type of films to hit our screens more consistently."

In contrast, Gautaman Bhaskaran of the Hindustan Times gave 2/5 and wrote, "For a good part, the film runs without dialogues, though the loud, almost irritatingly intrusive, background score robs the work of, what could have been otherwise, beautiful silence. And, what is downright silly is a government minister camping in the town – a man who is caught between a smart personal assistant and a haughty chief minister. Salman as the sales guy promoting an adhesive seems to hold out some promise, but Nazim and Madhoo sparkle. And with Mohan himself portraying a witty television news anchor, the film has its bright moments, but not enough to get more stars. If only there was greater finesse in treatment and the excision of some scenes, Vaayai Moodi Pesavum could have been gripping."

Malayalam version
The Times of India gave a rating of one-and-a-half out of five stars and opined that " At the end what we feel for this film and its director is the same emotion we reserve for a naughty kid who just wandered into a dense forest and just lost his way".

Box office 
The film collected  in Chennai until 11 May.

References

External links 
 

2010s avant-garde and experimental films
2010s Malayalam-language films
2010s satirical films
2010s Tamil-language films
2014 films
2014 multilingual films
2014 romantic comedy films
Films directed by Balaji Mohan
Films scored by Sean Roldan
Films shot in Kodaikanal
Films shot in Munnar
Indian avant-garde and experimental films
Indian multilingual films
Indian romantic comedy films
Indian satirical films
Indian films with live action and animation